The Lomond Hills (meaning either beacon hills or bare hills), also known outside the locality as the Paps of Fife, are a range of hills in central Scotland. They lie in western central Fife and Perth and Kinross, Scotland. At  West Lomond is the highest point in the county of Fife.

Etymology
The name Lomond Hills was first recorded Lomondys in 1315,  and may derive from a Pictish cognate of Welsh llumon, meaning "beacon",  an element found for example in the hill-name Pumlumon in Wales. Also suggested is derivation from Gaelic lom monadh, "bare hill",  perhaps adapted from an earlier Pictish name containing cognate elements.

Physical geography
The western portion of the escarpment runs southwards from West Lomond beyond the deep valley of the Glen Burn (Glen Vale) to Bishop Hill (locally, simply The Bishop). The steep-sided peaks of East and West Lomond themselves are volcanic in origin. Along the edges of the sandstone bed at the foot of the scarp slopes are several strikingly eroded outcrops, the most famous of which are the Bunnet Stane and John Knox's Pulpit, so named because it is believed to be a spot where covenanters held conventicles in the 17th century. There are also striking outcrops in the columnar jointing at the edge of the dolerite sill on Bishop Hill, most notably Carlin Maggie.

The River Eden, one of the two primary rivers in Fife, has its source on the slopes of West Lomond. On the northern slopes of the Lomond Hills, two burns run down from the plateau in impressive gorges. These are the Maspie Burn and the Arraty Burn. Maspie Den has a path running along its length to an undercut waterfall at the top, which can be accessed just beyond Falkland House (approaching from the Falkland direction). Glen Vale with the Glen Burn, to the south of West Lomond, is equally impressive.

Geology
The hills are formed from early Carboniferous sedimentary rocks overlying Devonian sandstones and intruded by sills and volcanic plugs during late Carboniferous and Permian times. The lower ground to the north and west is formed from late Devonian rocks of the Glenvale Sandstone Formation traditionally ascribed to the Old Red Sandstone. Overlying this and forming the lower slopes of the scarp are the early Carboniferous sandstones of the Knox Pulpit and the Kinnesswood formations. Next in succession are the Pathhead Formation rocks which include cycles of sandstones, siltstones, mudstones, ironstones and limestone, formerly referred to as the Calciferous Sandstone Measures. These in turn are overlain by the varied cyclic sequences of the Lower Limestone Formation.

The igneous rocks are relatively resistant to erosion and form the main scarp and two summits. A quartz-dolerite sill of probable Permo-Carboniferous age, forming a part of the Midland Valley Sill Complex intrudes the early Carboniferous sedimentary rocks of the Lower Limestone Formation. The peaks of West Lomond and Green Hill are nepheline-basanite intrusions whilst East Lomond is a teschenite/olivine dolerite intrusion and vent agglomerate.  A few faults affect the escarpment vertically offsetting the crags on either side. The Coul Fault is a northerly downthrowing fault aligned WNW-ESE running through the range and beneath Ballo Reservoir.

Many lower areas are draped with glacial till from the last ice age. Easterly directed meltwater channels occur around the northeastern and southern margins.

History
The remains of Iron Age hill forts can be found around the summits of both East and West Lomond as well as at Maiden Castle, a grassy knoll that lies between the two.

In more recent history, the Lomond Hills were mined for limestone, ore and lead, although there are no longer any working quarries there today. On the southwest slopes of East Lomond are the well preserved remains of a limekiln and quarry.

Beneath the northern slopes of the escarpment lies Falkland Estate, an area of forest (now commercial plantation), where the kings of Scotland would have hunted whilst staying at nearby Falkland Palace. The present custodian of the palace is Ninian Crichton-Stuart, brother of the Marquess of Bute.

Recreation and land management
Due to the steep gradients and poor soil, the primary land uses on the Lomond Hills are sheep grazing and commercial forestry (predominantly on the steep north slopes) and water catchment. There are six reservoirs in the Lomond Hills that were originally constructed to supply water to the rapidly growing mining towns of west Fife.

The Lomond Hills lie within the boundaries of Fife Regional Park, renamed the Lomond Hills Regional Park in 2003, and have their own ranger service who work principally with the landowners, estate managers and farmers on issues such as public access to help minimise the impact of recreational activities on their day-to-day business.

As a result of their accessibility and proximity to several major population centres, the hills are very popular with walkers. This has resulted in a considerable amount of footpath erosion, particularly on the steeper sections, that the ranger service and volunteer workers are taking measures to counteract. Alternative routes exist from the Bunnet Stane, the village of Falkland and the car park at the masts, high on East Lomond. The views from both summits, due to their prominence, are magnificent, stretching from the Highlands to the Borders, with the sea in the east.

As well as walking, there are a number of other recreational activities that take place in the Lomonds. East Lomond, due to the easy access from the high car park, is often used by paragliders on windy days. The Falkland Hill Race is held annually and begins at the fountain in the centre of Falkland village. The competitors must run (or in many cases walk) to the summit of East Lomond before returning to the fountain. The wooded northern slopes of East Lomond also boast a series of downhill mountainbike tracks.

Gliders from the Scottish Gliding Centre at Portmoak between Bishop Hill and Loch Leven may be seen riding the thermals above the hills.

Gallery

See also
 List of mountains in Scotland
 Maiden Paps
 Breast shaped hills

References

Blackwoods Edinburgh Magazine. Volume LXXIV, July–December 1853, Harvard College Library.

External links

 Lomond Hills Regional Park community website
 Fife Council
 Institute of Geography
 Walk In Scotland
Fife Regional Park Manifesto

Hills of Fife
Regional parks in Scotland
Mountains and hills of Perth and Kinross
Mountain ranges of Scotland